GFD may refer to:

Transport 
 Garfield railway station, in Victoria, Australia
 Glenfield railway station, Sydney, Australia
 Greenford station, in Greater London
 Pope Field (Indiana), an airport serving Greenfield, Indiana, United States

Other uses 
 General Film Distributors, a defunct British film distribution company
 Geophysical fluid dynamics
 Gluten-free diet